Paul Bird may refer to:

 Paul Bird (artist) (1923–1993), British artist
 Paul Bird (bishop) (born 1949), Australian bishop
 Paul Bird (cricketer) (born 1971), English cricketer
 Paul Bird (Paralympian) (born 1954), Australian Paralympic swimmer
 Paul Bird Motorsport, British motorcycle team

Bird, Paul